Bullshit Jobs: A Theory is a 2018 book by anthropologist David Graeber that postulates the existence of meaningless jobs and analyzes their societal harm. He contends that over half of societal work is pointless, and becomes psychologically destructive when paired with a work ethic that associates work with self-worth. Graeber describes five types of meaningless jobs, in which workers pretend their role is not as pointless or harmful as they know it to be: flunkies, goons, duct tapers, box tickers, and taskmasters. He argues that the association of labor with virtuous suffering is recent in human history, and proposes unions and universal basic income as a potential solution.

The book is an extension of a popular essay Graeber published in 2013, which was later translated into 12 languages and whose underlying premise became the subject of a YouGov poll. Graeber subsequently solicited hundreds of testimonials from people with meaningless jobs and revised his case into a book that was published by Simon & Schuster in May 2018.

Summary

In Bullshit Jobs, American anthropologist David Graeber posits that the productivity benefits of automation have not led to a 15-hour workweek, as predicted by economist John Maynard Keynes in 1930, but instead to "bullshit jobs": "a form of paid employment that is so completely pointless, unnecessary, or pernicious that even the employee cannot justify its existence even though, as part of the conditions of employment, the employee feels obliged to pretend that this is not the case." While these jobs can offer good compensation and ample free time, Graeber holds that the pointlessness of the work grates at their humanity and creates a "profound psychological violence". 

The author contends that more than half of societal work is pointless, both large parts of some jobs and, as he describes, five types of entirely pointless jobs:

 flunkies, who serve to make their superiors feel important, e.g., receptionists, administrative assistants, door attendants, store greeters;
 goons, who act to harm or deceive others on behalf of their employer, or to prevent other goons from doing so, e.g., lobbyists, corporate lawyers, telemarketers, public relations specialists;
 duct tapers, who temporarily fix problems that could be fixed permanently, e.g., programmers repairing shoddy code, airline desk staff who calm passengers whose bags do not arrive;
 box tickers, who create the appearance that something useful is being done when it is not, e.g., survey administrators, in-house magazine journalists, corporate compliance officers;
 taskmasters, who create extra work for those who do not need it, e.g., middle management, leadership professionals.

Graeber argues that these jobs are largely in the private sector despite the idea that market competition would root out such inefficiencies. In companies, he concludes that the rise of service sector jobs owes less to economic need than to "managerial feudalism", in which employers need underlings in order to feel important and maintain competitive status and power. In society, he credits the Puritan-capitalist work ethic for making the labor of capitalism into religious duty: that workers did not reap advances in productivity as a reduced workday because, as a societal norm, they believe that work determines their self-worth, even as they find that work pointless. Graeber describes this cycle as "profound psychological violence" and "a scar across our collective soul". Graeber suggests that one of the challenges to confronting our feelings about bullshit jobs is a lack of a behavioral script in much the same way that people are unsure of how to feel if they are the object of unrequited love. In turn, rather than correcting this system, Graeber writes, individuals attack those whose jobs are innately fulfilling.

Graeber holds that work as a source of virtue is a recent idea, that work was disdained by the aristocracy in classical times, but inverted as virtuous through then-radical philosophers like John Locke. The Puritan idea of virtue through suffering justified the toil of the working classes as noble. And so, Graeber continues, bullshit jobs justify contemporary patterns of living: that the pains of dull work are suitable justification for the ability to fulfill consumer desires, and that fulfilling those desires is indeed the reward for suffering through pointless work. Accordingly, over time, the prosperity extracted from technological advances has been reinvested into industry and consumer growth for its own sake rather than the purchase of additional leisure time from work. Bullshit jobs also serve political ends, in which political parties are more concerned about having jobs than whether the jobs are fulfilling. In addition, he contends, populations occupied with busy work have less time to revolt.

As a potential solution, Graeber suggests universal basic income, a livable benefit paid to all, without qualification, which would let people work at their leisure. The author credits a natural human work cycle of cramming and slacking as the most productive way to work, as farmers, fishers, warriors, and novelists vary in the rigor of work based on the need for productivity, not the standard working hours, which can appear arbitrary when compared to cycles of productivity. Graeber contends that time not spent pursuing pointless work could instead be spent pursuing creative activities.

Publication 

In 2013, Graeber published an essay in the magazine Strike, "On the Phenomenon of Bullshit Jobs", which argued the pointlessness of many contemporary jobs, particularly those in fields of finance, law, human resources, public relations, and consultancy. Its popularity, with over one million hits, crashed the website of its publisher, the radical magazine Strike! The essay was subsequently translated into 12 languages.

YouGov undertook a related poll, in which 37% of some surveyed Britons thought that their jobs did not contribute 'meaningfully' to the world.

Graeber subsequently solicited hundreds of testimonials of bullshit jobs and revised his case into a book, Bullshit Jobs: A Theory.

By the end of 2018, the book was translated into French, German, Italian, Spanish, Polish, and Chinese.

Reception 
A review in The Times praises the book's academic rigor and humor, especially in some job examples, but altogether felt that Graeber's argument was "enjoyably overstated". The reviewer found Graeber's historical work ethic argument convincing, but offered counterarguments on other points: that the average British workweek has decreased in the last century, that Graeber's argument for the overall proportion of pointless work is overreliant on the YouGov survey, and that the same survey does not hold that "most people hate their jobs". The reviewer maintains that while "managerial feudalism" can explain the existence of flunkies, Graeber's other types of bullshit jobs owe their existence to competition, government regulation, long supply chains, and the withering of inefficient companies—the same ingredients responsible for luxuries of advanced capitalism such as smartphones and year-round produce.

An article in Philosophy Now pointed to the initial definition of "bullshit" in philosophy. In his 1986 essay, Princeton philosopher Harry Frankfurt turned the word "bullshit" into an official philosophical term when defining bullshit as the deceptive misrepresentation of reality that remains different from lying because contrary to the liar, the "bullshitter" does not try to deceive (p. 6–7). Along these lines, administrators attempt to establish a work culture that is not false, but merely fake and phony.

A 2021 study empirically tested several of Graeber's claims, such as that bullshit jobs were increasing over time and that they accounted for a sizable amount of the workforce. Using data from the EU-conducted European Working Conditions Survey, the study found that a low and declining proportion of employees considered their jobs to be "rarely" or "never" useful. The study also found that while there was some correlation between occupation and feelings of uselessness, they did not correspond neatly with Graeber's analysis; bullshit "taskmasters" and "goons" such as hedge-fund managers or lobbyists reported that they were vastly satisfied with their work, while essential workers like refuse collectors and cleaners often felt their jobs were useless. However, the study did confirm that feeling useless in one's job was correlated to poor psychological health and with higher rates of depression and anxiety. To account for the serious effects of working a bullshit job and why someone might feel their job is bullshit, the authors instead draw on the Marxist concept of alienation. The authors suggest that toxic management and work culture may lead individuals to feel that they are not realizing their true potential, regardless of whether or not their job is actually useful or not.

See also 
 Decent work
 Make-work job
 Critique of work
 Refusal of work

References

External links 
 
 "On the Phenomenon of Bullshit Jobs: A Work Rant", Graeber's original essay
 Graeber interviewed on Book TV

2018 non-fiction books
Simon & Schuster books
Books by David Graeber
English-language books
Anthropology books
American non-fiction books
Literature critical of work and the work ethic
Universal basic income